Olavo Luiz Pimentel de Carvalho  (29 April 1947 – 24 January 2022) was a Brazilian polemicist, self-proclaimed philosopher, political pundit, former astrologer, journalist, and far-right conspiracy theorist. From 2005 until his death, he lived near Richmond, Virginia, in the United  States.

While publishing about politics, literature and philosophy since the 1980s, he made himself known to wider Brazilian audiences from the 1990s onwards, mainly writing columns for some of Brazil's major media outlets, such as the newspaper O Globo. In the 2000s, he began to use personal blogs and social media to convey his conservative and anti-communist ideas. In the late 2010s, he rose to prominence in the Brazilian public debate, being dubbed the "intellectual father of the new right" and the ideologue of Jair Bolsonaro, a label that he came to reject.

As a polemicist, Carvalho was criticized for often resorting to obscene ad hominem attacks. His books and articles have spread conspiracy theories and false information, and he has been accused of fomenting hate speech and anti-intellectualism. He positioned himself as a critic of modernity. His interests included historical philosophy, the history of revolutionary movements, the Traditionalist School and comparative religion. His views were rejected by some philosophers.

Professional career
Carvalho acted as an astrologer in the 1980s, having learned it from, among others, the Argentine psychologist Juan Alfredo César Müller. From the 1970s to the 2000s, he wrote for several Brazilian magazines and newspapers, such as Bravo!, Primeira Leitura, Claudia, O Globo, Folha de S.Paulo (starting in February 1977 with an article about The Magic Flute in the "Folhetim" literary supplement), Época and Zero Hora.

In 2002, Carvalho founded the website Maskless Media (Mídia Sem Máscara). It presents itself as an observatory of the news media. He was the host of the show True Outspeak on BlogTalkRadio, which aired from 2006 to 2013. As of 2019, he wrote a weekly column for the Brazilian newspaper Diário do Comércio and taught philosophy in an online course to over 2,000 students. He is said to have introduced to Portuguese-speaking readers works of important conservative philosophers of the 20th century, such as Eric Voegelin. In addition to newspaper articles and many blog and social media posts, he authored 32 books, many of them collections of previously published texts.

Carvalho founded the Inter-American Institute for Philosophy, Government, and Social Thought in 2009, and served as its president. He collaborated with Ted Baehr, Paul Gottfried, Judith Reisman, Alejandro Peña Esclusa, and Stephen Baskerville through the Inter-American Institute. The institute closed down in 2018, possibly due to complaints made by Olavo's former students to the Institute's board that, among other complaints, he never concluded the secondary education, and was not, as his profile in the Institute claimed, a former senior lecturer in the Catholic University of Paraná.

Role in the presidency of Jair Bolsonaro

Carvalho became one of the most influential individuals in the administration of Jair Bolsonaro. According to one account, Bolsonaro got interested in Carvalho's ideas in 2013. In 2014, Bolsonaro and Carvalho started transmitting their live video chats through politically conservative YouTube channels. In 2017, Carvalho was depicted as the "ideologue" of Bolsonaro, a title he has refuted.

In his first live speech on Facebook after being elected, Bolsonaro was pictured next to one of the books written by Carvalho, in what was interpreted as a sign of his influence over the newly elected president. It was claimed that Carvalho influenced the nomination of two prominent Ministers by Bolsonaro: Ricardo Vélez Rodríguez (Education) and Ernesto Araújo (Foreign Affairs).

In November 2018, after the Brazilian presidential election, Carvalho declared that, if nominated by President-elect Jair Bolsonaro, he would accept the role of Brazilian ambassador to the United States. However, in February 2019, Carvalho clashed with some key figures of the Bolsonaro administration, including the Vice-President, Hamilton Mourão, whom he accused of being a "traitor" and an "idiot" who is "pro-abortion, pro-disarmament and pro-Nicolas Maduro." Mourão dismissed the criticisms.

Death 
Olavo's family announced his death on social media, on January 24, 2022, eight days after he tested positive for COVID-19. His family's statement did not specify his cause of death, but his daughter Heloísa said that it was from coronavirus. His personal doctor denied it was COVID-19 and stated officially that his death was caused by respiratory stress associated with emphysema, heart failure, bacterial pneumonia, and a generalised infection. Olavo was known for his vaccine hesitancy and often questioned the severity of COVID-19 pandemic, spreading COVID-19 misinformation on his social media. According to his family, he died at a hospital outside of Richmond, Virginia. He is buried at St. Joseph's Cemetery in Petersburg, Virginia.

Controversies

Basic sciences 
Carvalho propagated disinformation about prominent ideas and figures of modern science. He contested ideas of physicists Isaac Newton and Albert Einstein, and mathematician Georg Cantor. He said Newton introduced a self-contradictory thesis and spread the virus of "formidable stupidity". Olavo also said Einstein's theory of general relativity was plagiarized. Carvalho contradicted Georg Cantor's work on transfinite numbers, accusing him of confusing "numbers with their mere signs", seeing his work as a "play with words" and a "false logic".

He also claimed that there are no proofs of heliocentrism and that geocentrism was as valid as heliocentrism "since you can use different points of reference." In 2018, on Facebook, he stated that he had no "definitive answer" to many "questions", such as whether the Earth is spherical or flat.

Olavo strongly disagreed with several figures who occupy a prominent place in the history of the sciences, such as Isaac Newton, and Giordano Bruno, who according to him "did not make any discoveries... He did not even study modern sciences, physics, astronomy, biology or mathematics, he was not condemned for defending scientific theories, but for practicing witchcraft, which at the time was a crime". The opposition extends to Galileo, of whom he writes:
A background of charlatanism appears to have already been introduced into physics by Galileo, when he proclaimed that he had overturned the notions of ancient science, according to which an object not propelled by an external force stands still—an illusion of the senses, he said. In fact, he pontificated, an object in such conditions remains stationary or in uniform and rectilinear motion. But, after having thus overthrown the old physics, he discreetly clarified that rectilinear and uniform movement does not really exist, but is a fiction conceived by the mind to facilitate measurements. Now if the object not moved from without stands still or has a fictitious movement, it means, strictly speaking, that it stands still in every case, just as ancient physics said, and that Galileo, by means of a new system of measurements, could only explain why it stands still. That is to say, Galileo did not dispute ancient physics, he merely invented a better way of proving that it was correct, and that the testimony of the senses, being true enough, does not have in itself proof of its veracity, which was well known since the time of Aristotle. It was this episode that inaugurated the craze of modern scientists to take simple changes of methods as if they were "proofs" of a new constitution of reality.

Fetuses as sweetener 
Carvalho also spread the hoax of Pepsi using cells from aborted fetuses to sweeten soft drinks.

Climate change 
Carvalho claimed that global warming is a hoax produced by a global conspiracy. He based his claims on the Climategate episode in which hackers, on the eve of the Copenhagen Conference, disseminated thousands of e-mails from University of East Anglia climatologists in order to undermine the credibility of the conference. Carvalho claimed Climategate to be the work of a conspiracy led by the Rockefeller family, the Council of Foreign Relations, the Bilderberg Club, and the New World Order, indicating them also as leaders of the "global abortion and gay ... campaigns of the new bionic global religion, and of the Obama administration's proposal for universal control of the movement of capital."

Health 
In a 2016 Twitter post, Carvalho claimed that "vaccines either kill you or drive you crazy. Never vaccinate your children."

He falsely declared that AIDS does not pose a risk to heterosexuals, basing his arguments on journalist Michael Fumento's book The Myth of Heterosexual Aids.

On 22 March 2020, during the COVID-19 pandemic, a disease caused by the SARS-CoV-2 virus, he stated in a livestream on YouTube that there was no confirmed case of death from the virus in the world and that the pandemic would be "an invention" and "the most extensive manipulation of public opinion that has ever happened in human history". At that date, according to the World Health Organization, there were more than 294,000 cases of the disease and 12,784 deaths from it.

Politics 
Carvalho spread the debunked conspiracy theory that Barack Obama was not born in the United States. Furthermore, he claimed that Foro de São Paulo "is the largest political organization that has ever existed in Latin America and undoubtedly one of the largest in the world." He also made up the fake information that a book written by Fernando Haddad, the opponent of Jair Bolsonaro during the 2018 Brazilian general election, promoted incest.

On 17 March 2019, Carvalho criticised the presence of military personnel in Bolsonaro's administration, stating: "He didn't choose two hundred generals. Two hundred generals chose him. Those people want to restore the 1964 regime under a democratic aspect. They're ruling and using Bolsonaro as a condom [sic]. I'm not saying that it is the reality, but it is what they want. Mourão said that they would return to power democratically. If it is not a coup, it is a coup mentality."

Sleeping Giants started a campaign to reduce his influence on Brazilian politics and convinced advertisers to remove their media buying from his online newspaper and YouTube channel. Also PayPal decided to cancel their contract and removed their services from his online seminars due to violation of terms of use.

On a January 2021 interview, Carvalho falsely claimed that election fraud took place in the 2020 American presidential election, stating "Everything in this election has been fraudulent.” During the same interview Carvalho falsely asserted that Joe Biden had Parkinson’s disease and that Biden and Kamala Harris were working for the Chinese government.

Religion 
Carvalho advocated a revisionist view of the Inquisition, claiming it is a myth spread by Protestants.

Litigation 
In 2020, Carvalho was ordered to pay 2.8 million Brazilian reais in libel charges after accusing musician Caetano Veloso of sexual crimes against children.

Personal life
At his death Olavo de Carvalho left his widow, eight children, and eighteen grandchildren.

His eldest daughter, Heloisa de Carvalho Martins Arriba, accused her father of occasional maltreatment of his children. All content was wrapped in a letter that was later shared on Facebook. According to the letter, Olavo had even pointed a gun to the head of one of his children. She made other accusations including that Olavo kept a polygamous relationship living with three wives at the same time. The accusations were denied by her siblings and by Olavo himself, who initiated a lawsuit against her citing that in her letter she "distances herself from any contact with reality by spreading outrageous lies and vile insults".

According to his daughter, Carvalho was a member of a Tariqa, an order of Sufism, but that was never verified.

Olavo de Carvalho reportedly confessed his sins to a Roman Catholic priest and received the last rites before his death.

Works

Essays 

 (1980). A Imagem do Homem na Astrologia. São Paulo: Jvpiter.
 (1983). O Crime da Madre Agnes ou A Confusão entre Espiritualidade e Psiquismo. São Paulo: Speculum.
 (1983). Questões de Simbolismo Astrológico. São Paulo: Speculum.
 (1983). Universalidade e Abstração e outros Estudos. São Paulo: Speculum.
 (1985). Astros e Símbolos. São Paulo: Nova Stella.
 (1986). Astrologia e Religião. São Paulo: Nova Stella.
 (1986).  São Paulo: Nova Stella.
 (1992). Símbolos e Mitos no Filme "O Silêncio dos Inocentes". Rio de Janeiro: Instituto de Artes Liberais.
 (1993). Os Gêneros Literários: Seus Fundamentos Metafísicos. Rio de Janeiro: IAL & Stella Caymmi.
 (1993). O Caráter como Forma Pura da Personalidade. Rio de Janeiro: Astroscientia Editora.
 (1994).  Rio de Janeiro: Instituto de Artes Liberais & Stella Caymmi [São Paulo: Vide Editorial, 2014].
 (1994). Uma Filosofia Aristotélica da Cultura. Rio de Janeiro: Instituto de Artes Liberais.
  Rio de Janeiro: Topbooks, 1996 [São Paulo: É Realizações, 2007; Campinas, SP: Vide Editorial, 2013].
 (1995).  Rio de Janeiro: Diadorim [São Paulo: É Realizações, 2000; Campinas, SP: Vide Editorial, 2015].
 (1994).  Rio de Janeiro: Faculdade da Cidade [São Paulo: É Realizações, 2007; Rio de Janeiro: Record, 2018].
 (1997). O Futuro do Pensamento Brasileiro: Estudos sobre o Nosso Lugar no Mundo. Rio de Janeiro: Faculdade da Cidade Editora [É Realizações, 2007].
 (1998).  Rio de Janeiro: Topbooks [São Paulo: É Realizações, 2008; São Paulo: Record (forthcoming)].
 (2002–2006). Coleção História Essencial da Filosofia, 32 vol. São Paulo: É Realizações.
 (2007).  São Paulo: É Realizações [Campinas, SP: Vide Editorial, 2015].
 (2011). Maquiavel, ou A Confusão Demoníaca. Campinas, SP: Vide Editorial.
 (2012). A Filosofia e seu Inverso. Campinas, SP: Vide Editorial.
 (2012). Os EUA e a Nova Ordem Mundial: Um Debate entre Olavo de Carvalho e Aleksandr Dugin. Campinas, SP: Vide Editorial. 2012. (with Aleksandr Dugin).
 (2013).  Edited by Felipe Moura Brasil. Rio de Janeiro: Record.
 (2013).  Campinas, SP: Vide Editorial.
 (2013).  Campinas, SP: Vide Editorial.
 (2014).  Campinas, SP: Vide Editorial.
 (2014). A Fórmula para Enlouquecer o Mundo: Cartas de um Terráqueo ao Planeta Brasil, vol. 3. Campinas, SP: Vide Editorial.
 (2015). A Inversão Revolucionária em Ação: Cartas de um Terráqueo ao Planeta Brasil, vol. 4. Campinas, SP: Vide Editorial.
 (2016). O Império Mundial da Burla: Cartas de um Terráqueo ao Planeta Brasil, vol. 5. Campinas, SP: Vide Editorial.
 (2016). O Dever de Insultar: Cartas de um Terráqueo ao Planeta Brasil, vol. 6. Campinas, SP: Vide Editorial.
 (2017). Breve Retrato do Brasil: Cartas de um Terráqueo ao Planeta Brasil, vol. 7. Campinas, SP: Vide Editorial.
 (2022). O Imbecil Coletivo III: O Imbecil Juvenil. Campinas, SP: VIDE Editorial.
 (2022). O Foro de São Paulo: A ascensão do comunismo latino-americano. Campinas, SP: VIDE Editorial.

Other publications

 (1973). Tabu, by Alan Watts. São Paulo: Editora Três (translation and preface, with Fernando de Castro Ferreira).
 (1981). A Metafísica Oriental, by René Guénon. São Paulo: Escola Júpiter (translation).
 (1984). Comentários à “Metafísica Oriental” de René Guénon, by Michel Veber. São Paulo: Speculum (introduction and notes).
 (1997).  by Arthur Schopenhauer. Rio de Janeiro: Topbooks (introduction, notes and explanatory comments).
 (1997). O Espírito das Revoluções, by J.O. de Meira Penna. Rio de Janeiro: Faculdade da Cidade Editora (preface).
 (1998). O Exército na História do Brasil, 3 Vol. Rio de Janeiro/Salvador: Biblioteca do Exército & Fundação Odebrecht (editor).
 (1998). Teatro Oficina: Onde a Arte não Dormia, by Ítala Nandi. Rio de Janeiro: Faculdade da Cidade Editora (preface).
 (1999). Ensaios Reunidos, 1942–1978, by Otto Maria Carpeaux. Rio de Janeiro: UniverCidade & Topbooks (introduction and notes).
 (1999).  by Alain Peyrefitte. Rio de Janeiro: Topbooks (introduction).
 (1999). Aristóteles, by Émile Boutroux. Rio de Janeiro: Record (introduction and notes).
 (2001). As Seis Doenças do Espírito Contemporâneo, by Constantin Noica. Rio de Janeiro: Record (introduction and notes).
 (2001). Admirável Mundo Novo, by Aldous Huxley. São Paulo: Editora Globo (preface).
 (2001). A Ilha, by Aldous Huxley. São Paulo: Editora Globo (preface).
 (2001). A Coerência das Incertezas, by Paulo Mercadante. São Paulo: É Realizações (introduction and notes).
 (2001). A Sabedoria das Leis Eternas, by Mário Ferreira dos Santos. São Paulo: É Realizações (introduction and notes).
 (2002). A Origem da Linguagem, by Eugen Rosenstock-Huessy. Rio de Janeiro: Editora Record (edition and notes, with Carlos Nougué).
 (2004). Escolha e Sobrevivência, by Ângelo Monteiro. São Paulo: É Realizações (preface).
 (2008). O Eixo do Mal Latino-americano e a Nova Ordem Mundial, by Heitor de Paola. São Paulo: É Realizações (preface).
 (2011). O Enigma Quântico, by Wolfgang Smith. Campinas, SP: VIDE Editorial (preface).
 (2014). Ponerologia: Psicopatas no Poder, by Andrzej Łobaczewski. Campinas, SP: VIDE Editorial (preface).
 (2015). A Tomada do Brasil, by Percival Puggina. Porto Alegre: Editora Concreta (preface).
 (2015). Cabo Anselmo: Minha Verdade, by José Anselmo dos Santos. São Paulo: Matrix (preface).
 (2017). 1964: O Elo Perdido; O Brasil nos Arquivos do Serviço Secreto Comunista, by Mauro "Abranches" Kraenski and Vladimir Petrilák. Campinas, SP: VIDE Editorial (preface).
 (2019). A Vida Intelectual, by A.-D. Sertillanges. São Paulo: Kírion (preface).
 (2019). Traição Americana: O Ataque Secreto aos Estados Unidos, by Diana West. São Paulo: Sophia Perennis (preface)

Works in English

 (2000). "Otto Maria Carpeaux." Portuguese Literary & Cultural Studies. Special Issue, No. 4. João Cezarde Castro Rocha (org.), University of Massachusetts, Dartmouth.
 (2005). "From Poetics to Logic: Exploring Some Neglected Aspects of Aristotle's Organon," in Handbook of the First World Congress and School on Universal Logic, UNILOG'05, ed. Jean-Yves Beziau and Alexandre Costa-Leite. pp. 57–59.

Translated works

 (2016). Statele Unite și Noua Ordine Mondială: O Dezbatere între Olavo de Carvalho și Aleksandr Dughin. Translated by Simina Popa and Cristina Nițu. Bucharest: Editura Humanitas. Translation of Os EUA e a Nova Ordem Mundial (with Alexander Dugin).

References

Notes

External links

  
 Olavo de Carvalho's articles , at Diário do Comércio 

1947 births
2022 deaths
Astrologers
Brazilian anti-vaccination activists
Brazilian anti-communists
Brazilian conspiracy theorists
Brazilian emigrants to the United States
Brazilian essayists
Brazilian Internet celebrities
Brazilian journalists
Brazilian literary critics
Brazilian male writers
Brazilian philosophers
Brazilian traditionalist Catholics
Conservatism in Brazil
Deaths from the COVID-19 pandemic in Virginia
Anti-vaccination activist deaths from the COVID-19 pandemic
Far-right politics in Brazil
Former Marxists
Metaphysicians
People from Campinas
People from Richmond, Virginia
Pseudohistorians
Roman Catholic writers
Traditionalist Catholic conspiracy theorists
Writers from Virginia